Bronopol (INN; chemical name 2-bromo-2-nitropropane-1,3-diol) is an organic compound that is used as an antimicrobial. It is a white solid although commercial samples appear yellow.

The first reported synthesis of bronopol was in 1897.

Bronopol was invented by The Boots Company PLC in the early 1960s and first applications were as a preservative for pharmaceuticals. Due to its low mammalian toxicity at in-use levels and high activity against bacteria, especially Gram-negative species, bronopol became popular as a preservative in many consumer products such as shampoos and cosmetics. It was subsequently adopted as an antimicrobial in other industrial environments such as paper mills, oil exploration, and production facilities, as well as cooling water disinfection plants.

Production
Bronopol is produced by the bromination of di(hydroxymethyl)nitromethane, which is derived from nitromethane by a nitroaldol reaction.  World production increased from the tens of tonnes in the late 1970s to current estimates in excess of 5,000 tonnes. Production today is the business of low cost producers, mainly in China.

Applications

Bronopol is used in consumer products as an effective preservative agent, as well as a wide variety of industrial applications (almost any industrial water system is a potential environment for bacterial growth, leading to slime and corrosion problems - in many of these systems bronopol can be a highly effective treatment).

The use of bronopol in personal care products (cosmetics, toiletries) has declined since the late 1980s due to the potential formation of nitrosamines. While bronopol is not in itself a nitrosating agent, under conditions where it decomposes (alkaline solution and/or elevated temperatures) it can liberate nitrite and low levels of formaldehyde and these decomposition products can react with any contaminant secondary amines or amides in a personal care formulation to produce significant levels of nitrosamines (due to the toxicity of these substances, the term 'significant' means levels as low as 10s of parts per billion).

Manufacturers of personal care products are therefore instructed by regulatory authorities to avoid the formation of nitrosamines which might mean removing amines or amides from the formulation, removing bronopol from a formulation, or using nitrosamine inhibitors.

Bronopol has been restricted for use in cosmetics in Canada.

Physical and chemical properties

Appearance
Bronopol is supplied as crystals or crystalline powder, which may vary from white to pale yellow in colour depending on the grade. The yellow coloration is due to chelation of iron during the manufacturing process.

Melting point
As a pure material, bronopol has a melting point of about 130 °C. However, due to its polymorphic characteristics, bronopol undergoes a lattice rearrangement at 100 to 105 °C and this can often be wrongly interpreted as the melting point.

At temperatures above 140 °C, bronopol decomposes exothermically releasing hydrogen bromide and oxides of nitrogen.

Solubility
Bronopol is readily soluble in water; the dissolution process is endothermic. Solutions containing up to 28% w/v are possible at ambient temperature.

Bronopol is poorly soluble in non-polar solvents but shows a high affinity for polar organic solvents.

Partition coefficient
Study of the solubility data shows that bronopol has a high affinity for polar rather than non-polar environments. In two-phase systems, bronopol partitions preferentially into the polar (usually aqueous) phase.

Stability in aqueous solution
In aqueous solutions, bronopol is most stable when the pH of the system is on the acid side of neutral. Temperature also has a significant effect on stability in alkaline systems.

Degradation
Under extreme alkaline conditions, bronopol decomposes in aqueous solution and very low levels of formaldehyde are produced. Liberated formaldehyde is not responsible for the biological activity associated with bronopol. Other decomposition products detected after bronopol breakdown are bromide ion, nitrite ion, bromonitroethanol and 2-hydroxymethyl-2-nitropropane-1,3-diol.

Allergy

In 2005–2006, it was the 15th-most-prevalent allergen in patch tests (3.4%) of people with suspected allergic contact dermatitis. It is used as a substitute for formaldehyde, a disinfectant and preservative, in solvents. It is prevalent in skin and personal care products and topical medications.

See also
 Bronidox

References

External links
 Material Safety Data Sheet for Bronopol

Organobromides
Nitro compounds
Diols